Jean-Bertrand Aristide (born 1953) was a Haitian priest and president of Haiti.

Aristide, the spelling of the name Aristides in French, Italian, Romanian, etc., may also refer to:

People
Aristide Aubert Du Petit Thouars (1760–1798), French naval officer
Aristide Farrenc (1794–1865), French flautist, musicologist and music publisher
Honoré-Jean-Aristide Husson (1803–1864), French academic sculptor
Aristide Letorzec (known as Lajariette) (1808–1848), 19th-century French playwright
Aristide Boucicaut (1810–1877), French entrepreneur, founder of Le Bon Marché
Aristide Cavaillé-Coll (1811–1899), French organ builder
Joseph Aristide Landry (1817–1881), member of the U. S. House of Representatives for Louisiana
Pierre Aristide Faron, Governor General of French Indochina (in office 1871–1875)
Aristide Gunnella (born 1931), Italian politician
Aristide Hignard (1822–1898), French composer of light opera and friend of Jules Verne
Aristide Marre (1823-1918), French linguist
Aristide Auguste Stanislas Verneuil (1823–1895), French physician and surgeon
Aristide Vallon (1826–1897), French naval officer, governor of Senegal, and member of Parliament
Élie-Aristide Astruc (1831–1905), French Rabbi, essayist, and Grand Rabbi of Belgium
Aristide Frémine (1837–1897), French writer
Aristide Croisy (1840–1899), French sculptor
Aristide Rinaldini (1844–1920), Italian Cardinal
Aristide Cavallari (1849–1914), Cardinal of the Roman Catholic Church and Patriarch of Venice
Tell Aristide Frédéric Antoine Chapel (1849–1932), French General
Aristide Bruant (1851–1925), French cabaret singer, comedian, and nightclub owner
Aristide Leonori (1856–1928), Italian architect and engineer
Giulio Aristide Sartorio (1860–1932), Italian painter and film director
Aristide Joseph Bonaventure Maillol (1861–1944), French sculptor, painter, and printmaker
Aristide Caradja (1861–1955), Romanian entomologist and lawyer
Aristide Briand (1862–1932), French statesman and Prime Minister
Aristide Petrilli (1868–1930), Italian sculptor
Aristide Razu (1868–1950), Romanian Divisional General
Aristide Blais (1875–1964), Canadian physician and senator
Paul Montel, born Paul Antoine Aristide Montel (1876-1975), French mathematician
Aristide Beaugrand-Champagne (1876–1950), Canadian landscape architect and architect
Aristide Blank (1883–1960), (also spelled Blanc or Blanck), Romanian financier, economist, arts patron and playwright
Aristide Pontanani, Italian Olympic fencer (1912 Olympics)
Aristide Garbini (1890–1950), Italian film actor
Aristide Berto Cianfarani (1895–1960), Italian-born American sculptor
Aristide Merloni (1897–1970), Italian businessman, founder of the Merloni industries
Aristide Gromer (born 1908), French chess master
Aristide Compagnoni (1910–1995), Italian cross country skier
Aristide Rompré (1912–1976), Canadian businessman and politician
Aristide Coscia (1918–1979), Italian professional football player and coach
Henry Aristide Boucher, Jr. (1921–2009), lieutenant governor of Alaska
Aristide Sartor (born 1923), French Olympic rower
Aristide Pozzali (1931–1979), Italian boxer
Aristide Guarneri (born 1938), Italian footballer
Jules-Aristide Bourdes-Ogouliguende (1938–2018), Gabonese politician
Aristide Laurent (1941–2011), American publisher and LGBT activist
Aristide Menezes (1947–1994), political figure in Guinea-Bissau
Aristide von Bienefeldt (1959–2016), the pen name of the Dutch novelist Rijk de Jong
Mildred Trouillot-Aristide (born 1963), American lawyer and wife of Jean-Bertrand Aristide, the former President of Haïti
Aristide Benoît Zogbo (born 1981), Ivorian professional football goalkeeper
Aristide Bancé (born 1984), Burkinabé footballer
Aristide Guerriero (born 1986), Italian former shot putter and throwing specialist, and coach
Aristide Bahin (born 1987), Ivorian footballer
Aristide Mugabe (born 1988), Rwandan professional basketball player

Other
Aristide and the Endless Revolution, 2005 feature documentary about Haitian President Jean-Bertrand Aristide
Aristide Briand (Paris Métro), a future station of the Paris Métro